Winston Ronald Gerschtanowitz (born 2 October 1976, in Amsterdam, Netherlands) is a Dutch presenter and actor.

Education 
Gerschtanowitz completed a HAVO education at the Keizer Karel College in Amstelveen.

Career 
Gerschtanowitz' first became famous to the general audience for his role as Harm van Cloppenburg in the Dutch soap Goudkust.

After this Gerschtanowitz became part of Dutch boy band 4 Fun together with fellow actors Michiel de Zeeuw, Jimmy Geduld en Chris Zegers.

Gerschtanowitz would later feature in various television programs, most notable of which was the lifestyle-show Wannahaves.

In 2005, Gerschtanowitz would switch over to Talpa. Here he would present the shows Thuis and In de huid van....

In 2007, Gerschtanowitz would participate in the second season of Dancing on Ice on RTL4, after which he would regularly be featured on the channel. In June 2008, Gerschtanowitz would replace Daphne Bunskoek as the main presenter of the popular show RTL Boulevard. In 2010 Gerschtanowitz was a presenter of the talent-show  The Voice of Holland which he presented for its first four seasons. During this period he would also present Let's Get Married in 2011, Your Face Sounds Familiar in 2012 and Postcode Loterij: Beat The Crowd in 2014.

In 2017, Gerschtanowitz left RTL4 and switched to SBS6 where he would be presenting large studio shows. His first program at SBS6 was Wat vindt Nederland?. He would later also present It takes 2 with Gordon.

Gerschtanowitz would feature as extra in several movies, most notable of which the 2004 movie Gay.

Off-screen
Winston Gerschtanowitz is the owner and founder of Media Republic. Media Republic specialized in creating multimedia television formats. He produced Jong Zuid (a soap for smartphones) and 2GOTV (a television channel for mobile platforms).
 
Between 2015 and 2016, Gerschtanowitz served as CCO of Talpa Media.

Personal life
On 9 juli 2011, Gerschtanowitz married Renate Verbaan. The two already had two sons before marrying, born in 2008 and 2010.

Gerschtanowitz is an amateur golfer. He has handicap 13.5. In 2009, he participated in the Pro-Am of the KLM Open in the team of Peter Hedblom.

Filmography 
 Gay - uncredited (2004)
 Gooische Vrouwen - Himself (2011)
 Leve Boerenliefde - Himself (2013)

Television

As presenter 
 Gouden Televizier-Ring Gala - with Tooske Breugem (2004)
 AVRO's Sterrenjacht (2004)
 RTL Boulevard (2004-2005, 2007–2008, Main presenter: 2008–2017)
 Thuis (2005)
 In de huid van... (2005)
 1 Miljoen Wat? (2006-2007)
 Eén tegen 100 - postcode Kanjer special (2009)
 Ik kom bij je eten (2009)
 The Voice of Holland (2010-2013)
 Let's Get Married (2011)
 De Postcode Loterij Nieuwjaarsshow (2012)
 Your Face Sounds Familiar (2012)
 Postcode Loterij Miljoenenjacht (2013, 1 episode, replacing Linda de Mol)
 Postcode Loterij: Beat The Crowd (2014)
 Wat vindt Nederland? (2017)
 Mensenkennis (2017–2018)
 Circus Gerschtanowitz (2017)
 BankGiro Loterij The Wall (2018–2019)
 It Takes 2 (2019) with Gordon
 Nederland Geeft Licht (2019) with Leonie ter Braak
 Dancing on Ice (2019) with Patty Brard
 50/50 (2020-heden), with Kim-Lian van der Meij as of season 3
 Marble Mania (2021-heden)
 Shownieuws (2021, 1 episode)
Car Wars (2021)

As guest/participant 
 Raymann is laat (2003)
 Barend & Van Dorp (2003)
 Goedemorgen Nederland (2004)
 Kopspijkers (2004)
 Spuiten en Slikken (2006)
 Dancing on Ice (2007)
 Shownieuws (2007)
 Jensen! (2007)
 Ik hou van Holland (2008, 2009, 2010, 2013, 2015)
 Ranking the stars (2007)
 Carlo & Irene: Life4You (2009)
 Pownews (2011)
 De Jongens tegen de Meisjes (2011)
 Het Perfecte Plaatje (2016)
 De Kluis (2019)
 The Masked Singer (2022)

As actor 
 Goudkust - Harm van Cloppenburg (1996-2000)
 Goede tijden, slechte tijden - Laurent van Buuren (1997)
 Pittige tijden - Harm / Meta (1997-1998)
 Baantjer - Otto (1999)
  - Golfbal (2001)
 Shouf Shouf Habibi! - Daan (2004)
 Gooische Vrouwen - Himself (2008)
 Zeg 'ns Aaa - Himself (2009)
 De TV Kantine - Bud Bundy (2010)
 Dokter Deen - Himself (2013)
 Divorce - Himself (2014)

References

Living people
1976 births
Dutch male television actors
Dutch television presenters
Mass media people from Amsterdam